Mallinson is an English surname. Notable people with the surname include:

Albert Mallinson (1870–1946), English composer
Allan Mallinson (born 1949), English author and army officer
Brian Mallinson (born 1947), British cricketer
David Mallinson (born 1946), English footballer 
James Mallinson (1943–2018), English record producer
James Mallinson (author) (born 1970), British indologist, writer, translator and nobleman
Jeremy Mallinson, English naturalist and conservationist
John Mallinson (trade unionist) (1860–1929), British politician 
John C. Mallinson (1932–2015), British physicist 
Roger Mallinson (born 1945), British submariner rescued from sunken submersible Pisces III in 1973
Rory Mallinson (1913–1976), American actor

See also
Mallinson baronets
Charles Mallinson, fictional character in James Hilton's novel Lost Horizon

References

English-language surnames